Oleksandr Shadchyn (born 17 April 1969) is a Ukrainian volleyball player. He competed in the men's tournament at the 1992 Summer Olympics.

References

External links
 

1969 births
Living people
Ukrainian men's volleyball players
Olympic volleyball players of the Unified Team
Volleyball players at the 1992 Summer Olympics
People from Kremenchuk
Sportspeople from Poltava Oblast
20th-century Ukrainian people